Daniel Dubeau is the chief human resources officer and deputy commissioner of the Royal Canadian Mounted Police. He also served as acting commissioner of the same force following Bob Paulson's retirement in 2017, until Brenda Lucki was appointed commissioner in April 2018.

Awards 
Dubeau received the following medals during his policing career:

References

External links 
 RCMP biography

Royal Canadian Mounted Police commissioners
Year of birth missing (living people)
Living people
People from the Municipal District of Bonnyville No. 87
Harvard Law School alumni
University of Alberta alumni